Candangolândia is an administrative region in the Federal District in Brazil.

See also
List of administrative regions of the Federal District

References

External links

 Regional Administration of Candangolândia website
 Government of the Federal District website

1994 establishments in Brazil
Administrative regions of Federal District (Brazil)
Populated places established in 1994